Battle of the Vozha River (Russian Битва на реке Воже) was a battle fought between the Grand Duchy of Moscow and the Golden Horde on 11 August 1378. Mamai sought to punish the Russians for disobedience.

The Russians were led by Prince Dmitri Ivanovich of Moscow, who had not yet received his nickname Donskoi. The Tatars were commanded by murza Begich. The two armies met near the river Vozha, a tributary of the Oka. After successful reconnaissance Dmitri managed to block the ford which the Tatars intended to use for the crossing of the river. He occupied a good position for his troops on a hill. The Russians' formation had a shape of a bow with Donskoy leading the center and the flanks under the command of Timofey Velyaminov and Andrei of Polotsk.

After waiting a long time, Begich decided to cross the river and to encircle the Russians from both sides. However, the attack of the Tatar cavalry was repelled and the Russians went over to a counter-attack. The Tatars left their tracks and began retreating in disorder, many of them drowned in the river. Begich himself was killed.

The Vozha battle was the first serious victory of the Russians over a big army of the Golden Horde. It had a big psychological effect before the famous Battle of Kulikovo because it demonstrated the vulnerability of the Tatar cavalry which was unable to overcome tough resistance or withstand determined counter-attacks. For Mamai, the defeat of Vozha meant a direct challenge by Dmitry which caused him to start a new unsuccessful campaign two years later.

References

See also
 Tatar invasions
 Russo-Kazan Wars
 Grand Duchy of Moscow
 Mongol invasion of Rus
 Timeline of the Tataro-Mongol Yoke in Russia

1378 in Europe
the Vozha River
the Vozha River
the Vozha River
14th century in the Grand Duchy of Moscow
History of Ryazan Oblast